The Daihatsu Charmant is a subcompact sedan built by Daihatsu of Japan, based on the Toyota Corolla. It was succeeded by the Daihatsu Applause two years after Charmant production ended. The Charmant was heavily based on the E20 Toyota Corolla; model changes paralleled those of the Corolla. All Charmants were fitted with Toyota inline-four engines, ranging from 1.2 to 1.6 litres. The word charmant is French for "charming."

When it was introduced, it was the largest Daihatsu sold in Japan, with the Charade/Consorte supermini, and the Fellow Max kei class car as the smallest.



First generation (A10/A20/A30/A40; 1974–1981)

First presented in November 1974, the first generation Daihatsu Charmant was based on the E20 Corolla platform. Equipped with 1166 cc engines producing 66 PS (SAE) and 1290 cc engines producing 72 PS (SAE) at 5,200 rpm. This type of engines were coded as 3K (1.2 L) and 4K (1.3 L) Toyota engines and came with a four- or five-speed manual transmission, as well as a two-speed automatic option. The 88 PS (SAE) 1588 cc overhead valve 12T engine was also available from 1978 on; this could also be ordered with a three-speed automatic with overdrive. There was also a 1.4-litre engine available, offering 86 PS (SAE).

In Japan only the 1.2- and 1.4-litre models were originally available, as the A10 and A20. These were replaced by the 1.3 and the 1.6 in April 1978 (A30 and A40), along with minor changes to the exterior and interior, including a new grille and dashboard. A protective side strip was also added. The new engines were the 4K-U and the 2T-U, while the van received the 4K-J (while retaining the T-J) - these engines fulfilled the commercial vehicle emissions specifications. In July an automatic version of the 1.6 appeared.

Unique to the first generation, a station wagon was also available. This was called "Van" in the Japanese domestic market, where it was classed as a commercial vehicle. The Van was introduced in December 1974, a month after the saloons.

This model was exported to a fair number of countries, mostly markets without their own automobile industry. It was the first Daihatsu to be sold in Iceland, where a large number of surplus cars from the Netherlands were brought in the summer of 1979. Sold at a very low price, it was one of Iceland's most popular cars that year.

Second generation (A35/A55; 1981–1987)

A new Charmant was launched at the Frankfurt Motor Show in September 1981 with new squarer bodywork that was somewhat outmoded already when being introduced, as was its front-engine, rear-wheel drive layout. Due to Daihatsu's unfamiliarity with the process of presenting new cars in Frankfurt, the car was omitted from most official press releases and several automobile writers overlooked the fact that there was a new car on Daihatsu's stand. The only bodywork available was a four-door saloon.

In the export, the 1.6-litre  2T engine was also available; power outputs ranged from  depending on compression ratios and intended markets. For the 1984 model year, the larger engine was changed to the overhead cam 4A unit, with an alloy head. Performance improved marginally while the gas mileage was considerably better. Trim levels were LD, LC, LE, and LGX; these continued until 1987 when the range was discontinued in the United Kingdom and most other export markets. All the engines were carburetted. In Japan, the top trim package (with available climate control) were called "Altair".

The Charmant had an independent front suspension (struts), and a live four-link rear axle. Suspension settings were soft, for maximum comfort. The car then underwent a minor facelift in autumn 1984. The original leaf springs at the rear were replaced by coilovers at this time.

European market models became available with a catalyzed version of the 4A engine for the last few years; this fuel injected engine produces . The Daihatsu Charmant production ended in late 1987, while the shared Toyota Corolla platform changed to FWD in 1983. When the Charmont stopped production, it left Daihatsu without a compact sedan until 1989, when the Applause was introduced.

References

Charmant
Cars introduced in 1974
1980s cars
Rear-wheel-drive vehicles
Sedans